The Scene is a miniseries created by Jun Group. This first-of-its-kind film was targeted to peer-to-peer (P2P) users, both in distribution, subject and style.

The series were financed through sponsorship deals and released for free on the web and on P2P networks under a Creative Commons license (attribution, no derivative works).  Mitchell Reichgut, director of the series, says in an e-mail newsletter:

Season 1
The story centers on Drosan (Brian Sandro), a member of a fictitious scene group called CPX. Drosan is forced by circumstances to sell the pre-release films to commercial unauthorized distributors in Asia.

Each episode is filmed as a combination of a webcam video showing one of the actors superimposed on their desktop, showing e-mail, Internet Relay Chat (IRC) and instant messaging conversations. Most of the action takes place on the computer screen.

Cast
 Joe Testa as Drosan (Brian Sandro)
 Trice Able as melissbliss04 (Melissa)
 Laura Minarich as danaburke123 (Dana Burke)
 Dinarte Freitas as coda
 Noah Rothman as slipknot (Johannes)
 Jill Howell as trooper (Jodi)
 Curt Rosloff as teflon (Ed Koenig)
 Nick White as pyr0 (David)

Music featured in The Scene

The theme song is Catch Me by Maylynne.

Season 2

The Scene continued for a second season. Instead of focusing on warez culture, the second season took a look at illicit weapons trade happening online, as the director of the series saw the storyline of season 1 to be complete. The production pace of the series had changed from one monthly episode to much shorter weekly episodes.

Cast
 Samantha Turvill as sng330 aka Houdini6 aka Lukai (Danika Li)
 (Katerina Li)

Music featured in The Scene 2.0

Parody
Close to the initial release of The Scene, a spin-off parody called Teh Scene was released on the Internet. It imitated the format of the original series and overtly criticised it for its possible connections with groups opposed to unauthorized copying (and Sony sponsorship in general), mocking its amateurish approach to depicting people who copy and distribute software without authorization using the exaggerated mannerisms of script kiddies. "Teh Scene" featured a dynamic format (as opposed to The Scenes static presentation of a computer monitor, on which a small video and a few instant messaging windows would appear).

The parody also released its first episode for season 2 on November 1, 2006. From what is seen in the first episode of season 2, they are not going to have the same storyline or concept as seen in The Scene season 2.

Cast 
 Hydrosan
 Jordan as T3hSuppl13r
 Matt Jakubowski (Jaku) as Agent Gryphun Symthe
 LordDusty as Agent Fitzgerald aka babygurl123

References

External links
 Official Site
 Jun Group Entertainment
 The Scene on YouTube
 Slashdot discussion (season 1)
 The Scene on archive.org.
 The Scene on 0xDB.
 Teh Scene on archive.org.
 Teh Scene on 0xDB.
 magnet link

Warez
Screenlife films